Pelamushi is a Georgian dessert porridge commonly made in autumn, composed of a thick, hard chilled jelly made from grape juice and flour. Pelamushi is usually served with peeled nuts or gozinaki .

References

Cuisine of Georgia (country)